The 2015 Oregon State Beavers baseball team represented Oregon State University in the 2015 NCAA Division I baseball season.  The Beavers play their home games at Goss Stadium at Coleman Field and are members of the Pac-12 Conference.  The team is coached by Pat Casey in his 21st season at Oregon State.

Awards and honors
2015 was another award-winning year for Oregon State.  It was the fourth straight year a Beaver player garnered a major conference award and third year in a row that at least four players were named to the All-Conference First Team.

Postseason
Although the Beavers finished second in the Pac-12 they were not selected as a Regional host site for the opening round of the 2015 NCAA Division I baseball tournament.  Oregon State was the #2 seed of the Dallas Regional with host and #1 seed Dallas Baptist, #3 Texas and #4 Virginia Commonwealth.  After winning their first game against Texas the Beavers were eliminated after dropping two straight versus VCU and Dallas Baptist.

Roster

Coaches

Schedule

Ranking movements

References

Oregon State Beavers baseball seasons
Oregon State
Oregon State Beavers Baseball
Oregon State